No Fences is the second studio album by the American country music artist Garth Brooks. It was released on August 27, 1990, and reached No. 1 on Billboard's Top Country Albums chart. The album also reached No. 3 on the Billboard 200. On the latter chart it stayed in the top 40 for 126 weeks. No Fences remains Brooks' best-selling studio album to date with 18 million copies shipped in the US, and is the album that made him an international star. It was his first album issued in Europe (the original European release contained the four singles from his US debut as bonus tracks).

Singles
Some of Brooks' most famous songs appear on No Fences, including: "The Thunder Rolls" (CMA's 1991 Video of the Year), "Friends in Low Places" (Academy of Country Music's 1990 Single of the Year), "Unanswered Prayers" and "Two of a Kind, Workin' on a Full House". A cover version of The Fleetwoods' "Mr. Blue" appears on the album. The album itself was named Album of the Year by the ACM in 1990. It reached Number 1 on the British country music charts (earning Brooks his first gold album in that country) and remained charted for over five years.

The track "Victim of the Game" was later covered by Brooks's friend and future wife Trisha Yearwood for her 1991 eponymous debut album.

Brooks later re-recorded the track "Wild Horses", and released the new recording as a single in early 2001, reaching #7 on the country chart.

25th anniversary reissue
In September 2015, it was announced No Fences would be reissued later in the year to commemorate its 25-year release anniversary. The release would include a new version of "Friends in Low Places", featuring George Strait, Jason Aldean, Florida Georgia Line, and Keith Urban singing along with Brooks. The album release has since been delayed due to royalty disputes.

Track listing

Personnel
The following credits are sourced from liner notes included with the album's release.

Musicians

 Pat Alger – acoustic guitar, harmony and backing vocals
 Bruce Bouton – pedal steel guitar, harmony and backing vocals
 Tim Bowers – bass guitar, harmony and backing vocals
 Garth Brooks – lead, harmony and backing vocals, acoustic guitar
 Mark Casstevens – acoustic guitar
 Mike Chapman – bass guitar, harmony and backing vocals
 Johnny Christopher – acoustic guitar
 Ty England – acoustic guitar, harmony and backing vocals
 Dave Gant – piano, keyboard, organ, fiddle, harmony and backing vocals
 James Garver – electric guitar, harmony and backing vocals
 Rob Hajacos – fiddle, harmony and backing vocals
 Chris Leuzinger – electric guitar
 Steve McClure – electric and pedal steel guitars
 Edgar Meyer – double bass
 Mike Palmer – drums, percussion
 Brian Petree – harmony and backing vocals
 Milton Sledge – drums
 Bobby Wood – piano, keyboards, organ, harmony and backing vocals
 Nashville String Machine – string orchestra

Backing and harmony vocalists

Friends in Low Places
 Pat Alger
 Al "Shaggy" Barclay
 Dewayne Blackwell
 Bruce Bouton
 Tim Bowers
 Sandy Brooks
 Stephanie C. Brown
 Mike Chapman
 Bob Doyle
 The Englands (plus one)
 Dave Gant
 Rob Hajacos
 Joe Harris
 Dan Heins
 Rusty "Race Horse" Jones

 Steve King
 Earl of Bud Lee
 Pam "The Chick" Lewis
 Buddy Mondlock
 Steve Morley
 Mike "Palmerman"
 Brian Petree
 Dale Pierce
 Jim Rooney
 Tami Rose
 Lee Sartin
 Charlie Stefl
 Scott Stem
 Bobby Wood

Unanswered Prayers
 Wendy Johnson
 Jennifer O'Brien
 Hurshel Wiginton
 Curtis Young
Wolves
 Indian River
 David McVay
 Stephen Tolman
 Neil Thrasher
 Curry Worsham

Recording
 Denny Purcell – mastering engineer
 Mark Miller – recording and mixing engineer
 Dan Heins – harmony and backing vocals, audio engineer

Charts

Weekly charts

Year-end charts

Decade-end charts

Certifications

See also
 List of best-selling albums in the United States

References

1990 albums
Garth Brooks albums
Albums produced by Allen Reynolds
Capitol Records albums